Chen Chih-hsiung (18 February 1916 – 28 May 1963) was a Taiwanese independence activist.

Biography
Chen was born in what was known as Akō Chō, a division of Japanese Taiwan, in 1916. He studied Dutch at the Tokyo University of Foreign Languages, and was also fluent in English, Japanese, Malay, Taiwanese and Mandarin. He was sent by the Japanese government to the Dutch East Indies in 1942, shortly after Japan had begun its occupation of the territory, to serve as a translator. Chen stayed in Indonesia after the end of World War II and found work designing jewelry. He sided with Sukarno in the subsequent Indonesian National Revolution and was imprisoned by the Dutch for a year. After the revolution, Sukarno named Chen an honorary citizen of Indonesia. Chen later joined Thomas Liao's Formosa Democratic Independence Party and helped secure Liao a trip to the Bandung Conference held in 1955. The next year, Liao appointed Chen the ambassador to Southeast Asia upon the formation of the Japan-based . The Indonesian government eventually arrested Chen and rescinded his passport before deporting him. Chen then traveled to Switzerland and was granted citizenship there before moving to Japan to see Liao. The Kuomintang forced Chen's return to Taiwan and asked him to cease his pro-independence advocacy. Despite the Kuomintang authorities' request, Chen founded another pro-independence organization in 1961. The Taiwan Garrison Command arrested Chen for his actions the next year and imprisoned him in a facility on Qingdao Road in Taipei. In 1963, Chen became the first independence activist to be executed in Taiwan.

Chen was survived by his wife Chen Ying-niang, whom he met in Indonesia, and three children.

References

1916 births
1963 deaths
Executed Taiwanese people
Naturalised citizens of Switzerland
People executed by Taiwan by firearm
People from Pingtung County
People of the Indonesian National Revolution
Prisoners and detainees of the Netherlands
Taiwan independence activists
Taiwanese exiles
Taiwanese people of Hoklo descent
Taiwanese people imprisoned abroad
Taiwanese revolutionaries
Tokyo University of Foreign Studies alumni
Taiwanese expatriates in Indonesia
Taiwanese translators
20th-century translators